Ross Schunk (born April 28, 1986 in Portland, Oregon) is an American soccer player who last played for Colorado Rapids in Major League Soccer.

Career

College and Amateur
Schunk attended Woodrow Wilson High School, where he acquired his skills under the training of Don Juan Mercado. At a young age, Ross was known for his outstanding crossbar and soccer-tennis skills. Although widely speculated, it's known by many living in southwest Portland, Schunk developed his skills from the founding members of Gabe Academy (Don Juan Mercado and Shiloh were two of the founding fathers, among others). Ross would spend summers in Gabriel Park getting hustled by Shiloh. Many credit this with his playful spirit and love for the game, because the games were always just that: fun. No collecting ever took place.

He played college soccer at the University of Redlands from 2005 to 2008. He led his team in goals, assists and points in his junior year in 2007, and was named to the All-Far West Third-Team, the All-West First-Team, the All-SCIAC First Team, and was a Second-Team All-American. He finished his college career as a two-time Southern California Intercollegiate Athletic Conference Player of the Year, and with 126 points, making him Redlands' all-time career points leader.

Schunk also played for the Los Angeles Legends in the USL Premier Development League where he was a prolific goalscorer, netting 15 times in 27 games during his two years with the team.

Professional
Schunk was the only NCAA Division III player invited to the 2009 MLS combine; he was drafted in the fourth round (47th overall) of the 2009 MLS SuperDraft by Colorado Rapids, and signed a professional contract on March 13, 2009.

He made his professional debut on April 7, 2009, in the Lamar Hunt U.S. Open Cup against Los Angeles Galaxy. He made his MLS debut on June 6, 2009, as a late substitute in a game against Real Salt Lake.

Schunk was also briefly sent on loan to USL Second Division club Real Maryland Monarchs in May 2009.

Schunk was waived by Colorado on 24 November 2010.

References

External links

1986 births
Living people
Soccer players from Portland, Oregon
American soccer players
Colorado Rapids players
USL League Two players
LA Laguna FC players
Major League Soccer players
Real Maryland F.C. players
USL Second Division players
Ida B. Wells-Barnett High School alumni
Colorado Rapids draft picks
University of Redlands alumni
Association football forwards